In traditional Chinese culture and the East Asian cultural sphere, qi, also ki or chi in Wade–Giles romanization, is believed to be a vital force forming part of any living entity. Literally meaning "vapor", "air", or "breath", the word qi is often translated as "vital energy", "vital force", "material energy", or simply as "energy". Qi is the central underlying principle in Chinese traditional medicine and in Chinese martial arts. The practice of cultivating and balancing qi is called qigong.

Believers in qi describe it as a vital force, the flow of which must be unimpeded for health. Qi is a pseudoscientific, unverified concept, and is unrelated to the concept of energy used in science (vital energy itself being an abandoned scientific notion). The historian of medicine in China Paul U. Unschuld adds that there "is no evidence of a concept of 'energy' – either in the strictly physical sense or even in the more colloquial sense – anywhere in Chinese medical theory."

Linguistic aspects

The cultural keyword qì is analyzable in terms of Chinese and Sino-Xenic pronunciations.

Pronunciation and etymology
The logograph  is read with two Chinese pronunciations, the usual qì  "air; vital energy" and the rare archaic xì  "to present food" (later disambiguated with ).

Reconstructions of the Middle Chinese pronunciation of  standardized to IPA transcription include: /kʰe̯iH/ (Bernard Karlgren), /kʰĭəiH/ (Wang Li), /kʰiəiH/ (Li Rong), /kʰɨjH/ (Edwin Pulleyblank), and /kʰɨiH/ (Zhengzhang Shangfang).

Reconstructions of the Old Chinese pronunciation of  standardized to IPA transcription include: /*kʰɯds/ (Zhengzhang Shangfang) and /*C.qʰəp-s/ (William H. Baxter and Laurent Sagart).

The etymology of qì interconnects with Kharia kʰis "anger", Sora kissa "move with great effort", Khmer kʰɛs "strive after; endeavor", and Gyalrongic kʰɐs "anger".

Characters
In the East Asian languages, qì has three logographs:
 is the traditional Chinese character, Korean hanja, and Japanese kyūjitai ("old character form") kanji
 is the Japanese shinjitai ("new character form") kanji
 is the simplified Chinese character.
In addition, qì  is an uncommon character especially used in writing Daoist talismans. Historically, the word qì was generally written as  until the Han dynasty (206 BCE–220 CE), when it was replaced by the  graph clarified with mǐ  "rice" indicating "steam (rising from rice as it cooks.)"

This primary logograph , the earliest written character for qì, consisted of three wavy horizontal lines seen in Shang dynasty (c. 1600–1046 BCE) oracle bone script, Zhou dynasty (1046–256 BCE) bronzeware script and large seal script, and Qin dynasty (221–206 BCE) small seal script. These oracle, bronze, and seal scripts logographs  were used in ancient times as a phonetic loan character to write qǐ  "plead for; beg; ask" which did not have an early character.

The vast majority of Chinese characters are classified as radical-phonetic characters. Such characters combine a semantically suggestive "radical characters" with a phonetic element approximating ancient pronunciation. For example, the widely known word dào  "the Dao; the way" graphically combines the "walk" radical  with a shǒu  "head" phonetic. Although the modern dào and shǒu pronunciations are dissimilar, the Old Chinese *lˤuʔ-s  and *l̥uʔ-s  were alike. The regular script character qì  is unusual because qì  is both the "air radical" and the phonetic, with mǐ  "rice" semantically indicating "steam; vapor".

This qì  "air/gas radical" was only used in a few native Chinese characters like yīnyūn  "thick mist/smoke", but was also used to create new scientific characters for gaseous chemical elements. Some examples are based on pronunciations in European languages: fú  (with a fú  phonetic) "fluorine" and nǎi  (with a nǎi  phonetic) "neon". Others are based on semantics: qīng  (with a jīng  phonetic, abbreviating qīng  "light-weight") "hydrogen (the lightest element)" and lǜ  (with a lù  phonetic, abbreviating lǜ  "green") "(greenish-yellow) chlorine".

The first Chinese dictionary of characters, the Shuowen Jiezi(121 CE) notes that the primary qì  is a pictographic character depicting  "cloudy vapors", and that the full  combines  "rice" with the phonetic qi , meaning  "present provisions to guests" (later disambiguated as xì ).

Meanings
Qi is a polysemous word. The unabridged Chinese-Chinese character dictionary Hanyu Da Cidian defines it as "present food or provisions" for the xì pronunciation but also lists 23 meanings for the qì pronunciation. The modern ABC Chinese-English Comprehensive Dictionary, which enters xì  "grain; animal feed; make a present of food", and a qì  entry with seven translation equivalents for the noun, two for bound morphemes, and three equivalents for the verb. n. ① air; gas ② smell ③ spirit; vigor; morale ④ vital/material energy (in Ch[inese] metaphysics) ⑤ tone; atmosphere; attitude ⑥ anger ⑦ breath; respiration b.f. ① weather  tiānqì ② [linguistics] aspiration  sòngqì v. ① anger ② get angry ③ bully; insult.

English borrowing
Qi was an early Chinese loanword in English. It was romanized as k'i in Church Romanization in the early-19th century, as ch'i in Wade–Giles in the mid-19th century (sometimes misspelled chi omitting the apostrophe), and as qi in Pinyin in the mid-20th century. It also gives eight usage examples, with the first recorded example of k'í in 1850 (The Chinese Repository), of ch'i in 1917 (The Encyclopaedia Sinica), and qi in 1971 (Felix Mann's Acupuncture)

The word qi is very frequently used in word games—such as Scrabble—due to containing a letter Q without a letter U.

Concept

References to concepts analogous to qi are found in many Asian belief systems. Philosophical conceptions of qi from the earliest records of Chinese philosophy (5th century BCE) correspond to Western notions of humours and to the ancient Hindu yogic concept of prana. An early form of qi comes from the writings of the Chinese philosopher Mencius (4th century BCE).

The ancient Chinese described qi as "life force". They believed it permeated everything and linked their surroundings together. Qi was also linked to the flow of energy around and through the body, forming a cohesive functioning unit. By understanding the rhythm and flow of qi, they believed they could guide exercises and treatments to provide stability and longevity.

Although the concept has been important within many Chinese philosophies, over the centuries the descriptions of qi have varied and have sometimes been in conflict. Until China came into contact with Western scientific and philosophical ideas, the Chinese had not categorized all things in terms of matter and energy. Qi and li (: "pattern") were 'fundamental' categories similar to matter and energy.

Fairly early on, some Chinese thinkers began to believe that there were different fractions of qi—the coarsest and heaviest fractions formed solids, lighter fractions formed liquids, and the most ethereal fractions were the "lifebreath" that animated living beings. Yuanqi is a notion of innate or prenatal qi which is distinguished from acquired qi that a person may develop over their lifetime.

Philosophical roots

The earliest texts that speak of qi give some indications of how the concept developed. In the Analects of Confucius, qi could mean "breath". Combining it with the Chinese word for blood (making 血氣, xue–qi, blood and breath), the concept could be used to account for motivational characteristics:

The philosopher Mozi used the word qi to refer to noxious vapors that would eventually arise from a corpse were it not buried at a sufficient depth. He reported that early civilized humans learned how to live in houses to protect their qi from the moisture that troubled them when they lived in caves. He also associated maintaining one's qi with providing oneself with adequate nutrition. In regard to another kind of qi, he recorded how some people performed a kind of prognostication by observing qi (clouds) in the sky.

Mencius described a kind of qi that might be characterized as an individual's vital energies. This qi was necessary to activity and it could be controlled by a well-integrated willpower. When properly nurtured, this qi was said to be capable of extending beyond the human body to reach throughout the universe. It could also be augmented by means of careful exercise of one's moral capacities. On the other hand, the qi of an individual could be degraded by adverse external forces that succeed in operating on that individual.

Living things were not the only things believed to have qi. Zhuangzi indicated that wind is the qi of the Earth. Moreover, cosmic yin and yang "are the greatest of qi. He described qi as "issuing forth" and creating profound effects. He also said "Human beings are born [because of] the accumulation of qi. When it accumulates there is life. When it dissipates there is death... There is one qi that connects and pervades everything in the world."

The Guanzi essay Neiye (Inward Training) is the oldest received writing on the subject of the cultivation of vapor [qi] and meditation techniques. The essay was probably composed at the Jixia Academy in Qi in the late fourth century B.C.

Xun Zi, another Confucian scholar of the Jixia Academy, followed in later years. At 9:69/127, Xun Zi says, "Fire and water have qi but do not have life. Grasses and trees have life but do not have perceptivity. Fowl and beasts have perceptivity but do not have yi (sense of right and wrong, duty, justice). Men have qi, life, perceptivity, and yi." Chinese people at such an early time had no concept of radiant energy, but they were aware that one can be heated by a campfire from a distance away from the fire. They accounted for this phenomenon by claiming "qi" radiated from fire. At 18:62/122, he also uses "qi" to refer to the vital forces of the body that decline with advanced age.

Among the animals, the gibbon and the crane were considered experts at inhaling the qi. The Confucian scholar Dong Zhongshu (ca. 150 BC) wrote in Luxuriant Dew of the Spring and Autumn Annals: "The gibbon resembles a macaque, but he is larger, and his color is black. His forearms being long, he lives eight hundred years, because he is expert in controlling his breathing." ("")

Later, the syncretic text assembled under the direction of Liu An, the Huai Nan Zi, or "Masters of Huainan", has a passage that presages most of what is given greater detail by the Neo-Confucians:

Role in traditional Chinese medicine
The Huangdi Neijing ("The Yellow Emperor's Classic of Medicine", circa 2nd century BCE) is historically credited with first establishing the pathways, called meridians, through which qi allegedly circulates in the human body.

In traditional Chinese medicine, symptoms of various illnesses are believed to be either the product of disrupted, blocked, and unbalanced qi movement through meridians or deficiencies and imbalances of qi in the Zang Fu organs. Traditional Chinese medicine often seeks to relieve these imbalances by adjusting the circulation of qi using a variety of techniques including herbology, food therapy, physical training regimens (qigong, t'ai chi ch'uan, and other martial arts training), moxibustion, tui na, or acupuncture.The cultivation of Heavenly and Earthly qi allow for the maintenance of psychological actions

The nomenclature of Qi in the human body is different depending on its sources, roles, and locations. For sources there is a difference between so-called "Primordial Qi" (acquired at birth from one's parents) and Qi acquired throughout one's life. Or again Chinese medicine differentiates between Qi acquired from the air we breathe (so called "Clean Air") and Qi acquired from food and drinks (so-called "Grain Qi"). Looking at roles Qi is divided into "Defensive Qi" and "Nutritive Qi". Defensive Qi's role is to defend the body against invasions while Nutritive Qi's role is to provide sustenance for the body. To protect against said invasions, medicines have four types of qi; cold, hot, warm, and cool. Cold qi medicines are used to treat invasions hot in nature, while hot qi medicines are used to treat invasions cold in nature. looking at locations, Qi is also named after the Zang-Fu organ or the Meridian in which it resides: "Liver Qi", "Spleen Qi", etc. Lastly, prolonged exposure to the three evil qi (wind, cold, and wetness) can result in the penetration of evil qi through surface body parts, eventually reaching Zang-Fu organs. 

A qi field (chu-chong) refers to the cultivation of an energy field by a group, typically for healing or other benevolent purposes. A qi field is believed to be produced by visualization and affirmation. They are an important component of Wisdom Healing Qigong (Zhineng Qigong), founded by Grandmaster Ming Pang.

Scientific view
The existence of Qi has not been proven scientifically. A 1997 consensus statement on acupuncture by the United States National Institutes of Health noted that concepts such as qi "are difficult to reconcile with contemporary biomedical information".

Practices involving qi

Feng shui

The traditional Chinese art of geomancy, the placement and arrangement of space called feng shui, is based on calculating the balance of qi, interactions between the five elements, yin and yang, and other factors. The retention or dissipation of qi is believed to affect the health, wealth, energy level, luck, and many other aspects of the occupants. Attributes of each item in a space affect the flow of qi by slowing it down, redirecting it or accelerating it. This is said to influence the energy level of the occupants. Positive qi flows in curved lines, whereas negative qi travels in straight lines. In order for qi to be nourishing and positive, it must continue to flow not too quickly or too slowly. In addition, qi should not be blocked abruptly, because it would become stagnant and turn destructive.

One use for a luopan is to detect the flow of qi. The quality of qi may rise and fall over time. Feng shui with a compass might be considered a form of divination that assesses the quality of the local environment.

There are three kinds of qi, known as heaven qi (tian qi 天气), Earth qi (di qi 地气), and human qi (ren qi 人气). Heaven qi is composed of natural forces including the sun and rain. Earth qi is affected by heaven qi. For example, too much sun would lead to drought, and a lack of sun would cause plants to die off. Human qi is affected by earth qi, because the environment has effects on human beings. Feng shui is the balancing of heaven, Earth, and human qi.

Reiki

Reiki is a form of alternative medicine called energy healing. Reiki practitioners use a technique called palm healing or hands-on healing through which a "universal energy" is said to be transferred through the palms of the practitioner to the patient in order to encourage emotional or physical healing. Reiki is a pseudoscience, and is used as an illustrative example of pseudoscience in scholarly texts and academic journal articles. It is based on qi ("chi"), which practitioners say is a universal life force, although there is no empirical evidence that such a life force exists. Clinical research has not shown reiki to be effective as a treatment for any medical condition. There has been no proof of the effectiveness of reiki therapy compared to the placebo effect. An overview of reiki investigations found that studies reporting positive effects had methodological flaws. The American Cancer Society stated that reiki should not replace conventional cancer treatment, a sentiment echoed by Cancer Research UK and the National Center for Complementary and Integrative Health. Developed in Japan in 1922 by Mikao Usui, it has been adapted into varying cultural traditions across the world.

According to its believers, Reiki healing occurs by laying hands over or on an individual’s area of pain and controlling the universal Qi flow of the nearby space, sending into the area of malaise and purifying it. There is no regulation of the practicing of Reiki in the United States and generally no central world organization that has authority over it.

Qigong

Qìgōng (气功 or 氣功) involves coordinated breathing, movement, and awareness. It is traditionally viewed as a practice to cultivate and balance qi. With roots in traditional Chinese medicine, philosophy and martial arts, qigong is now practiced worldwide for exercise, healing, meditation, and training for martial arts. Typically a qigong practice involves rhythmic breathing, slow and stylized movement, a mindful state, and visualization of guiding qi.

Martial arts

Qi is a didactic concept in many Chinese, Vietnamese, Korean and Japanese martial arts. Martial qigong is a feature of both internal and external training systems in China and other East Asian cultures. The most notable of the qi-focused "internal" force (jin) martial arts are Baguazhang, Xing Yi Quan, T'ai Chi Ch'uan, Southern Praying Mantis, Snake Kung Fu, Southern Dragon Kung Fu, Aikido, Kendo, Hapkido, Aikijujutsu, Luohan Quan, and Liu He Ba Fa.

Demonstrations of qi or ki are popular in some martial arts and may include the unraisable body, the unbendable arm, and other feats of power. These feats can be explained using biomechanics and physics.

Acupuncture and moxibustion

Acupuncture is a part of traditional Chinese medicine that involves insertion of needles or the application of pinching/gripping into/onto superficial structures of the body (skin, subcutaneous tissue, muscles) at acupuncture points to balance the flow of qi. This is often accompanied by moxibustion, a treatment that involves burning mugwort on or near the skin at an acupuncture point.

Taoist sexual practices

See also

 Aether (classical element)
 Aṣẹ (Yoruba)
 Aura (paranormal)
 Chakra
 Dantian
 Esoteric healing
 Geist
 Livity (spiritual concept)
 Mana
 Orgone
 Prana
 Reiki
 Pneuma
 Soul
 Scientific skepticism

Notes

References

Works cited

Further reading

External links

 Article by Bing YeYoung "A Philosophical and Cultural Interpretation of Qi"
 The Skeptics Dictionary
 Qi Encyclopedia

Aikido
Chinese martial arts terminology
Concepts in Chinese folk religion
Concepts in Chinese philosophy
Consciousness–matter dualism
Energy (esotericism)
Neo-Confucianism
Pseudoscience
Qigong
Reiki
Taoist cosmology
Vitalism